Miss World 1976, the 26th edition of the Miss World pageant, was held on 18 November 1976 at the Royal Albert Hall in London, United Kingdom. The winner was Cindy Breakspeare from Jamaica. She was crowned by Miss World 1975, Wilnelia Merced of Puerto Rico. Runner-up was Karen Jo Pini representing Australia, third was Diana Marie Roberts Duenas from Guam, fourth was Carol Jean Grant of United Kingdom, and fifth was Merja Helena Tammi from Finland. 

Several entrants were forced by their national governments to withdraw to boycott the presence of separate black and white contestants from apartheid South Africa.

Results

Placements

Contestants
60 contestants competed for the title.

Withdrawals in protest against South Africa 

  – Naina Sudhir Balsavar
  – Lorraine Wede Johnson (did not compete)
  – Che Puteh Che Naziauddin
  – Anne-Lise Lasur
  – Joy Conde
  – Lynn Elisea Gobine
  – Tamara Ingrid Subramanian
  – Zanella Tutu Tshabalala
  – Slavica Stefanović

Notes

Debuts

Returns

Last competed in 1965:
 
Last competed in 1969:
 
Last competed in 1972:
 
Last competed in 1973:
 
Last competed in 1974:

Did not compete
  - Jane Bird had flown to London to compete at Miss World. However, the organization did not allow her to compete due to Rhodesia's current political situation.

References

External links
 Pageantopolis – Miss World 1976

Miss World
1976 in London
1976 beauty pageants
Beauty pageants in the United Kingdom
Events at the Royal Albert Hall
November 1976 events in the United Kingdom